Subisu Cablenet Ltd. is a Nepalese Internet Service Provider company located in Kathmandu, Nepal, and was established in 2001. Subisu employs over 1500 full-time employees, of which around 900 are technical, and around 700 are non-technical. As of 2023, the company has over 235,000 customers. It has coverage at all 77 districts of Nepal. Subisu primarily provides cable & fiber internet and Digital TV services through a hybrid fiber-coaxial (HFCC) network. Internet and 280+ TV channels that it offers provides a strong spine to Nepal's educational, entertainment, professional and other sectors. It is the first and the only cable internet service provider in Nepal.

Infrastructure
Optical fiber cable (OFC) is used by Subisu to transmit TV channels, the internet, and fiber connect solutions. Its HFC network uses high-end coaxial cable laid with MPLS (Multi-Label Protocol Switching) and a fully redundant metropolitan access network. The network's headend is at Baluwatar, Kathmandu, and spreads across major locations of the valley. Signals from the OFC are tapped at points of service using an optical node with devices which convert light signals into Radio Frequency (RF) amplified to the desired levels using high bandwidth.

Technology
Data over Cable Service Interface Specifications (aka DOCSIS) 3.0 is advanced standard technology certified by Cable labs. DOCSIS 3.0 (Annex B) standard provides 42Mbit/s per channel (theoretically) and 37Mpbs (practically) downstream per channel. Downstream can be bond up to 8 channels which increases the downstream throughput up to (37 x 8)  and 27 M bit/s upstream bandwidth per channel and is the standard cable modem protocol established by MCNS to describe a protocol for bi-directional transfer of Internet Protocol (IP) traffic over cable. Subisu uses Metropolitan Access Network (MAN) technology to deliver internet/intranet and other services through optical fiber cables.

Subisu Services
MPLS Applications
Enterprise Internet
Broadband Internet through FTTH based on GPON
WAN Ethernet
DWDM Wavelength Services
EoSDH
Wholesale IP transit
Manages services
Network Security Solution
Digital Clear TV Services and Cable Internet

FTTH
Fiber to the home (FTTH) is the installation and use of optical fiber from ISP infrastructure directly to individual buildings such as residences, apartment buildings and businesses to provide unprecedented high-speed Internet access. FTTH supports high connection speeds available to end-users. It is used worldwide now to deliver data signals like the Internet, IPTV etc.

See also
Nepal Telecom
Telecommunications in Nepal

References

Telecommunications companies of Nepal
Companies based in Kathmandu
2001 establishments in Nepal